The Middlesex County Football League is a football competition based in England loosely drawing teams from the central, northern and western parts of Greater London. The league was founded in 1984 and initially had only one division, although it has since expanded greatly. It currently has a total of seven divisions. The Premier Division sits at step 7 (or level 11) of the National League System. It is a feeder to the Combined Counties Football League and the Hellenic Football League. The league is currently sponsored by Cherry Red Books.

History
The Middlesex County League was founded in 1984 as a single division. One year later, the league expanded to include a second division (Division One). In 1991 the league added a third tier, Division Two, which was discontinued during 1996–2002. On its reinstatement a fourth tier was also created (Division Three). For the 2006–07 season the league added a fifth level and the fourth level was regionalised. The divisions were named Division Three East and Division Three West. A further re-organisation in 2007–08 saw growth and the league expanded to six divisions: Division One acquired its split (into East and West), Division Three East was renamed Division Three, whilst Division Three West was renamed Division Three (Hounslow & District). By the end of the 2010–11 season, both Division Threes had been dropped, and the league spent two seasons with four divisions across three levels.

In 2013, a fourth-tier Combination Division was reintroduced below Division Two, and in 2017, a fifth tier, the Jeff Nardin Division, was added. In 2019, Division One was expanded to three divisions and Division Three was reintroduced between Division Two and the Combination, creating eight divisions in all. Division Three was dropped again for 2022–23, restoring the league to seven divisions across five levels.

Former members to progress through the pyramid are: Brook House, Hanworth Villa, CB Hounslow United, Rayners Lane, North Greenford United, Sutton Common Rovers, South Kilburn, Neasden Foundation, Bethnal Green United, Bedfont Sports, Hayes Gate, Southall, FC Romania, British Airways, Broadfields United, West Essex, FC Deportivo Galicia, St. Panteleimon, Hilltop and NW London.

In 2021, a mini tournament, the Middlesex Super 6, was organised following the abandonment of the season due to the COVID-19 pandemic, which featured Clapton Community, Cricklewood Wanderers, NW London, Stonewall, Sporting Hackney and AEK London, who won the tournament.

Member clubs (2022–23 season)

Premier Division

AVA
Camden United
CB Hounslow United Reserves
Clapton Community
Cricklewood Wanderers
Indian Gymkhana
Kensington Dragons
Kodak (Harrow)
Larkspur Rovers
OIR
PFC Victoria London
Pitshanger Dynamo
Shepherd's Bush
Stonewall

Division One Central/East
Alexandria Knights
Aloysius
Anubis
Bruce Castle United
Camden & Islington
Estudiantes
FC Marylebone
FC Wood Green
Kulture Klub
LBS Lions
Soccer Stars Fennecs
Stonewall Reserves

Division One South/West
AFC Southall
Brentham
Club Santacruzense de Londres
FC Deportivo Galicia Reserves
Eagles Land
Goan United
Hayes & Hillingdon
Hillingdon
Hillingdon Abbots
Ickenham
Kick X
Ruislip Town
Sporting Duet Academy

Division One North/West
Boston Manor
Brent United
Elite London
FC Irish of London
Harrow Bhoys
Harrow Town Eagles
Hillside
Hilltop Reserves
Illyrian
London Rangers
Springfield
St Lawrence Seniors
UKTSU

Division Two
Acton Ealing Whistlers
Bessingby Park Rangers
Hillingdon Abbots Reserves
Indian Gymkhana Reserves
Kensington Dragons Blues
Kodak (Harrow) Reserves
London Titans
Old Hat
Portobello FC
West London Wanderers
Whistlers
Wiseman West

Combination
CB Hounslow United 3rds
FC Sunbury
Inter London
Jamrock Shamrock
Kinja
LPFC Old Boys
SL Benfica
Southfield Athletic
Sudbury Court
Townmead
West SL Benfica

Jeff Nardin Division
Adamant
CB Hounslow United 4ths
Ealing Trailfinders
Kodak (Harrow) 3rds
London Athletic
LPOSSA
Rajputs del Mundo
West Palops

Past champions

References

External links
 Official website on Football.mitoo

 
1984 establishments in England
Football competitions in London
Football leagues in England
Sports leagues established in 1984